Brewco Motorsports was a racing team that competed in the NASCAR Busch Series (now the Xfinity Series). The team was owned from 1995 until 2007 by Clarence Brewer Jr., his wife Tammy, and Todd Wilkerson. The team won 10 races over 13 seasons in the Busch Series, and entered a single NASCAR Nextel Cup Series race in 2004. The team was sold to Mike Curb and Gary Baker with nine races left in the 2007 season, with both Brewco entries becoming part of Baker-Curb Racing.

NASCAR Nextel Cup Series 
In 2004, Brewco Motorsports entered the Chevy Rock & Roll 400 at Richmond International Raceway, with David Green driving the No. 27 Chevrolet sponsored by Timber Wolf. Green qualified in 34th place, and finished 31st, three laps down. At the time, Green was driving the No. 37 for Brewco in the Busch Series, with Timber Wolf as the sponsor. This would be Brewco's only race in the NASCAR Nextel Cup Series.

NASCAR Busch Series

Car No. 37 History
Mark Green (1995-1998)
Brewco debuted at the Kroger 200 at Indianapolis Raceway Park in 1995, with Mark Green finishing 18th in the No. 41 car. Green finished 28th-place at Richmond the next month, but failed to qualify for the last two races of the season. In 1996, after gaining sponsorship from Timber Wolf, the team changed their number to 37 and ran ten races with Green, posting a top-ten finish at Myrtle Beach Speedway. The team finally went full-time in 1997, with Green chalking up five top-ten finishes and finishing just 79 points shy of a top-ten finish in points.

Kevin Grubb (1999-2001)
After the 1998 season yielded four top-ten's, Green left for Washington-Erving Motorsports, and was replaced by Kevin Grubb. Grubb failed to qualify four times, but finished fifth at Richmond and was seventeenth in points at season's end. Grubb improved four spots the next season, with six top-tens, and in 2001, he had seven finishes of ninth or better.

Jeff Purvis (2002)
For 2002 Grubb departed for Carroll Racing, and was replaced by Jeff Purvis. Purvis won at Texas Motor Speedway in April, but almost died six weeks later from a crash at Nazareth Speedway. Kevin Lepage took his place, and won two poles, before Elton Sawyer finished out the last three races of the year.

David Green (2003-2006)
In 2003, the team switched from Chevrolet to Pontiac, and David Green (Mark's brother) took over the driving chores. The change was a success, as Green won three races and was runner-up in the championship standings in his first season with the team. After a winless 2004, in which the team drove a mixture of Chevrolets and Pontiacs, Brewco changed manufacturers to Ford, and moved the number 27 and its sponsor Kleenex to Green's team, with the existing No. 27 becoming the No. 66. In 2005, Green collected one win and finished eighth in the points, but in 2006, he struggled (finishing in the top 10 only twice), and was replaced by Casey Atwood late in the season.

Multiple drivers #27 (2007)
In 2007, Ward Burton, Jason Keller, Bobby East, and road course ringer Jorge Goeters split the No. 27 Ford Fusion, with sponsorship from Kimberly-Clark and State Water Heaters. Before the second Bristol race, Burton was replaced by Johnny Sauter, in what would be Brewco's final race. After Bristol, Brewer sold the team to Baker-Curb Racing.

Car No. 37 results

Car No. 27 History
Casey Atwood (1998-2000)
The No. 27 car debuted at Myrtle Beach Speedway in 1998, with Casey Atwood driving the car to a 28th-place finish. Scot Walters drove next, at California Speedway, finishing 43rd after handling problems plagued the car. The No. 27 went full-time in 1999, with Atwood driving, and Castrol as the new sponsor. Atwood won twice that year, at The Milwaukee Mile and Dover International Speedway, and finished 13th in points. He would not win in 2000, but he did finish eighth in points, and signed with Evernham Motorsports' Winston Cup program for 2001.

Jamie McMurray (2001-2002)
Atwood was replaced by rookie Jamie McMurray for the 2001 season, with Williams Travel Centers replacing Castrol as the sponsor (moving over from the team's part-time No. 39 car). After three top-ten finishes in 2001, McMurray won two times the next year and finished sixth in points, departing the team at the end of the season to drive for Chip Ganassi Racing in the Winston Cup Series.

Multiple drivers (2003)
In 2003, rookies Chase Montgomery and Joey Clanton shared the ride with Hank Parker Jr., with sponsorship coming from TrimSpa and Alice Cooper. Montgomery ran seven of the first nine races, with Parker Jr. running the other two. Clanton then ran the car for the next 18 races, before Montgomery returned for the rest of the season. The car had three top-ten finishes, one with each driver.

Johnny Sauter (2004)
In 2004, Johnny Sauter joined the team, with Kleenex coming aboard as sponsor. Sauter posted eight top-tens and had an 18th-place finish in points, but left for Phoenix Racing at the end of the season.

Duraflame #66 (2005-2006)
For 2005, while the 27 Kleenex team took the place of the former 37 car, the old 27 car switched to No. 66, with the number and Duraflame sponsorship moving from Rusty Wallace, Inc. to Brewco. Greg Biffle and Aaron Fike shared the driving duties that year, with Biffle winning once and garnering 16 top-ten finishes in 21 starts, while Fike had one top-ten in 11 starts. In 2006, Biffle shared the ride with Ken Schrader, Scott Wimmer, and Bobby Labonte.

Multiple drivers #37 (2007)
The team switched to the No. 37 for 2007 (the main number which had been used by Brewco from 1996-2004), while Rusty Wallace, Inc. regained its own original number, the No. 66. For the first half of the season, Greg Biffle and Jamie McMurray shared driving duties (except for one race where Johnny Sauter drove), with sponsorship from Cub Cadet and Yard-Man. Later, John Graham was named the driver for ten races (with Fun Energy Foods sponsoring), and Bobby East and Casey Atwood each drove a few races for the team (along with Biffle and McMurray). Between the fall races at Bristol and California Speedway, Brewer sold his team to Baker-Curb Racing, which took over the #37 at that point.

Car No. 27 results

Car No. 99 History
In 1999, Brewco partnered with J&J Racing to run the No. 99 car for Kevin Lepage in 15 races, sponsored by Red Man. The No. 99 also attempted an additional 6 races with Matt Hutter driving.

Car No. 39 History
Brewco's third car made its debut as the No. 39 in 2000, with Andy Kirby driving and sponsorship from Williams Travel Centers. Kirby attempted to qualify for 11 races in the No. 39, but only made it into four of them.

In 2001, Brewco ran their third car in two races as the No. 47, with Sean Woodside and Clay Dale driving.

Brewco's third car returned for the Federated Auto Parts 300 in 2006, as the No. 37 (a number previously used by Brewco from 1996-2004), and was driven by Brad Coleman with sponsorship from race sponsor Federated Auto Parts.

NASCAR Craftsman Truck Series

Truck No. 37 History 
Brewco's NASCAR Craftsman Truck Series team made its debut in 1997, as the No. 37 Chevrolet C/K sponsored by Red Man Golden Blend. That year, the truck was driven by Scot Walters, David Green, and Mark Green, attempting a total of 9 races, with Walters and David Green each scoring one top-ten. In 1998, Walters drove the truck for the full season, finishing 19th in points with three top-tens.

Truck No. 47 History 
At the 1997 Hanes 250 at Richmond International Raceway, Brewco ran a second truck, the No. 47, for Jeff Green (the brother of the team's drivers Mark and David Green). The truck would finish 33rd after handling problems took them out on lap 47.

See also
Curb Racing
ThorSport Racing

References

External links
Baker Curb Racing Official Website
Clarence Brewer Owner Statistics - Racing-Reference.info
Todd Wilkerson Owner Statistics - Racing-Reference.info
Mike Curb Owner Statistics - Racing-Reference.info
Gary Baker Owner Statistics - Racing-Reference.info
Mike Curb - NASCAR Owner
Mike Curb - NASCAR Racing

American auto racing teams
Defunct NASCAR teams
Auto racing teams established in 1995
Auto racing teams disestablished in 2007